NGC 3783 is a barred spiral galaxy located about 135 million light years away in the constellation Centaurus. It is inclined by an angle of 23° to the line of sight from the Earth along a position angle of about 163°. The morphological classification of SBa indicates a bar structure across the center (B) and tightly-wound spiral arms (a). Although not shown by this classification, observers note the galaxy has a luminous inner ring surrounding the bar structure. The bright compact nucleus is active and categorized as a Seyfert 1 type. This nucleus is a strong source of X-ray emission and undergoes variations in emission across the electromagnetic spectrum.

The source of the activity in this galaxy is a rapidly rotating supermassive black hole, which is located at the core and is surrounded by an accretion disk of dust. The estimated mass of this black hole, from reverberation mapping, is about 2.8 million times the mass of the Sun.

This is a member of a loose association of 47 galaxies known as the NGC 3783 group. The NGC 3783 group has a mean velocity of 2,903 ± 26 km/s with respect to the Sun and a velocity dispersion of 190 ± 24 km/s. The diffuse X-ray emission of the group is roughly centered on the galaxy NGC 3783.

References

External links
 
 

Barred spiral galaxies
Centaurus (constellation)
3783
Articles containing video clips
036101